Tana Moon is a fictional character appearing in American comic books published by DC Comics. She is a Metropolis reporter who was Superboy's first love and introduced as part of the Reign of the Supermen storyline. Tana Moon first appeared in Adventures of Superman #501 and was created by Karl Kesel and Tom Grummett.

Fictional character history
When the young clone of Superman (later known as Kon-El) escapes from Project Cadmus, he goes to the Daily Planet. He tells his story to Lois Lane who brushes him off, thinking he was just another publicity hound. He sees Tana and is attracted to her. Superboy spots Tana leaving a building and sweeps her into the sky. He agrees to give her an exclusive after learning she is an anchorwoman for the Galaxy Network Broadcasting owned by Vincent Edge. Tana urges Superboy into more spectacular heroic feats and her own popularity rises as a result.

Eventually she parts ways from Superboy, as a way to gain acceptance and fame as her own woman, not only as the Superboy reporter. She finds him again when Superboy settles down in Hawaii. After a while they rekindled her professional relationship, which eventually blossomed into true love, even if strained by the lack of maturity of Superboy, who was always in pursuit of a more exciting life between battles and girls.

During her time in Hawaii, Tana comes to befriend several more people. Agent Rex Leech, Rex's daughter Roxy, the super-powered Dubbilex and Bibbo Bibbowski's white puppy named Krypto. Roxy's love for Superboy would turn out to be a long-running conflict.

Superboy split up with Tana while he and Knockout were on the run from the law. Knockout turned out to be an evil murderer. Superboy defeats her and returns to Tana. Unfortunately, Tana shortly thereafter gave crucial information to Amanda Spence, who was posing as a harmless reporter. The info helped Spence and the Agenda capture Superboy and create the clone Match.

Tana struggled to keep alive their love, which was further affected by the knowledge Superboy would never age. The conflict with Roxy was soon neutralized. In the process of saving him from an illness, Roxy and Superboy's DNA come close to being identical, making them all but siblings. They decide to leave their feelings for each other as platonic. Despite this, Tana leaves again, only to find herself embroiled in Superboy's battle with The Agenda. During the battle she is electrocuted by the vengeful Amanda Spence and dies. Tana's death marked the end of innocence for Superboy, leading him to a more responsible life.

Spence would later use Tana Moon's DNA and splice it with the DNA of Bart Allen in order to create Cherub of the DNAngels.

Superboy, temporarily in adult form, would later confront Spence. Enraged, he slams Spence downward. This fools her into believing she is going to perish. He stops her movement, leaving her head inches from the floor. He declares that since he must live with the knowledge of what might have been with him and Tana, Spence must live with the knowledge she could have perished at his hands.

Superboy would battle and subdue Spence at least one more time.

In other media
Tana Moon appears in the BBC radio drama adaptation of "The Death of Superman", "Funeral For a Friend", and "Reign of the Supermen!" storylines. It was released as "Superman: Doomsday and Beyond" in the United Kingdom by BBC Audiobooks and as "Superman Lives!" in the United States by Time Warner Audiobooks.

References

External links
 Tana Moon at DC Comics Wiki

Fictional reporters
Comics characters introduced in 1993
DC Comics female characters
Characters created by Karl Kesel
Fictional characters from Hawaii

de:Superboy#Tana Moon